The Pointe de Zinal is a mountain of the Swiss Pennine Alps, located south of Zinal in the canton of Valais. It is situated east of the Dent Blanche, between the valleys of Zinal and Zmutt (Zermatt).

See also
List of mountains of Switzerland

References

External links
Pointe de Zinal on Hikr

Mountains of the Alps
Alpine three-thousanders
Mountains of Switzerland
Mountains of Valais